Stanley K. Bahe is a Navajo American painter. He studied at the Phoenix Indian School and has exhibited his work across the country, including at the Philbrook Art Center. Some of his works have been included in publications such as Arizona Highways magazine.

References 

20th-century American painters
20th-century indigenous painters of the Americas
Native American painters
Navajo artists